Woodson is the first non-single release by Kansas City, Missouri band The Get Up Kids. It was recorded at Red House Studios in Eudora, Kansas in November 1996. The album was originally released on Contrast Records, shortly before the band was signed to a two-record deal on Doghouse Records. The album was the first to be produced by Ed Rose, who would go on collaborate several other times with the band in the future.

Track listing

Original track Listing

Doghouse track list
Due to a distribution conflict, Doghouse Records released its own version of Woodson shortly after the Contrast release, combining the songs from the EP with the band's Loveteller EP. It was released on both 7" vinyl and compact disc.

Additional releases
The entire EP was later combined with the band's other EP Red Letter Day and re-released on one CD entitled: The EPs: Woodson and Red Letter Day".
The song "A Newfound Interest in Massachusetts" was later re-arranged and released on the band's Eudora album.
The song "Second Place" was covered by the hardcore band Coalesce, re-titled "I'm Giving Up on This One" and released on the Coalesce/Get Up Kids Split 7".
The song "Off the Wagon" was released as a b-side on the single for "A Newfound Interest in Massachusetts".

Personnel

Matt Pryor - Lead Vocals, Guitar
Jim Suptic - Guitar, Vocals
Rob Pope - Bass
Ryan Pope - Drums

Production
Ed Rose - Production
Design
Paul Drake - Photography

Notes

The Get Up Kids EPs
1997 debut EPs
Albums produced by Ed Rose